Hoseynabad-e Sofla (also Romanized as Ḩoseynābād-e Soflá; also known as Ḩoseynābād) is a village in Dasht-e Rum Rural District, in the Central District of Boyer-Ahmad County, Kohgiluyeh and Boyer-Ahmad Province, Iran. At the 2006 census, its population was 30, in 7 families.

References 

Populated places in Boyer-Ahmad County